The Miss New Jersey competition is an annual pageant held to select the representative for the state of New Jersey in the Miss America pageant.

Two Miss New Jersey winners have gone on to hold the title of Miss America: Bette Cooper who won in 1937 and Suzette Charles who did not win, but took over the title for the last 7 weeks of Vanessa Williams's reign in 1984. They also have one unofficial Miss America: Dorothy Hann (1932).

In the fall of 2018, the Miss America Organization terminated the Miss New Jersey organization's license as well as licenses from Florida, Georgia, New York, Pennsylvania, Tennessee, and West Virginia. On December 26, 2018; MAO reinstated the license for the Miss New Jersey organization for one year, contingent on leadership changes and the recruitment of new sponsors and board members.

Augostina Mallous of Cape May Court House was crowned Miss New Jersey 2022 on June 25, 2022 at the Superstar Theater in the Resorts Casino Hotel in Atlantic City, New Jersey. She competed for the title of Miss America 2023 at the Mohegan Sun in Uncasville, Connecticut in December 2022.

Gallery of past titleholders

Results summary
The following is a visual summary of the past results of Miss New Jersey titleholders at the national Miss America pageants/competitions. The year in parentheses indicates the year of the national competition during which a placement and/or award was garnered, not the year attached to the contestant's state title.

Placements
 Miss America: Bette Cooper (1937)
 1st runners-up: Kathryn M. Gearon (1921), Suzette Charles* (1984)
 2nd runners-up: Cheryl Carter (1970), Suzanne Plummer (1974), Therese Hanley (1981), Jennifer Makris (1995), Kaitlyn Schoeffel (2018)
 3rd runners-up: Ruth Brady (1938), Madeline Layton (1942), Mary D'Arcy (1978)
 Top 10: Emerita Monsch (1924), Emily Borbach (1924), Kathleen Harris (1943), Betty Jane Crowley (1949), Michele Sexton (1994), Victoria Paige (2000), Jill Horner (2001)
 Top 12: Mary Dillinger (1935), Elizabeth Koehler (1935)
 Top 15: Edith Becker (1924), Helen Corcoran (1925), Frances M. Glowaski (1925), Evelynne Jeanne Crowell (1926), Mildred Morlock (1926), Carolyn Pierson (1927), Margo Lundgren (1939), Delores Mendes (1947), Jennifer Farrell (2004), Jade Glab (2020)
 Top 16: June Stephens (1951)
 Top 18: Gertrude Christman (1933)

Awards

Preliminary awards
 Preliminary Evening Wear: Alicia Luciano (2003)
 Preliminary Lifestyle & Fitness: Suzanne Plummer (1974), Kathy Nejat (1998)
 Preliminary On Stage Interview: Jade Glab (2020)
 Preliminary Talent: Ruth E. Brady (1938), Suzette Charles (1984), Heather Hertling (1993)

Non-finalist awards
 Non-finalist Talent: Marilyn Beryl Rockafellow (1959), Georgia Malick (1963), Linda Gialanella (1973), Debra Naley (1982), Patricia La Terra (1985), Patricia Bowman (1989), Laura Murray (1990), Heather Hertling (1993), Dena Querubin (1996), Kathy Nejat (1998), Stephanie Ferrari (1999), Erica Scanlon (2005), Amy Polumbo (2008)

Other awards
 Miss Congeniality: Betty Jane Crowley (1949) (tie), Patricia Condon (1954)
 Amateur Beauty Award: Kathryn M. Gearon (1921)
 Amateur Beauty Award Second Prize: Mary Elizabeth Edwards (1922)
 Amateur Beauty Award Third Prize: Estelle Marks (1922) 
Jean Bartel Social Impact Initiative 2nd runner-up: Alyssa Sullivan (2022) 
 Overall Elegance and Lifestyle Award: Alicia Luciano (2003)
 Quality of Life Award Winners: Dena Querubin (1996), Lindsey Gianinni (2016)
 Quality of Life Award 2nd runners-up: Jill Horner (2001), Ashleigh Udalovas (2011)
 Quality of Life Award Finalists: Jaime Gialloreto (2019)

Winners

Note

Popular culture
In Philip Roth's Pulitzer Prize winning novel, "American Pastoral", the central character Seymour "Swede" Levov marries Dawn Dwyer, an Irish Catholic winner of Miss New Jersey 1949, from nearby Elizabeth, whom he met at Upsala College in East Orange, New Jersey.

In the Drake & Josh episode "Vicious Tiberius", the boys find out their teacher, Mrs. Hayfer, was the winner of Miss New Jersey 1976 while house sitting for her. The winner of the 1957 pageant is mentioned by title in the Martin Scorsese film Taxi Driver.

References

External links
 Miss New Jersey official website

New Jersey
New Jersey culture
Women in New Jersey
1921 establishments in New Jersey
Recurring events established in 1921
Annual events in New Jersey